Joshua Rifkin (born April 22, 1944 in New York) is an American conductor, pianist, and musicologist; he is currently a professor of music at Boston University. As a performer he has recorded music by composers from Antoine Busnois to Silvestre Revueltas, and as a scholar has published research on composers from the Renaissance to the 20th century.

Rifkin is known among classical musicians for his theory that most of Bach's choral works were sung with only one singer per choral line. Rifkin argued that "so long as we define 'chorus' in the conventional modern sense, then Bach's chorus, with few exceptions, simply did not exist." He is best known, however, for having played a central role in the ragtime revival in the 1970s, with the three albums he recorded of Scott Joplin's works for Nonesuch Records.

Musical career

Joplin 

Rifkin's Joplin albums (the first of which was Scott Joplin: Piano Rags in November 1970 on the classical label Nonesuch)—which were presented as classical music recordings—were critically acclaimed, commercially successful and led to other artists exploring the ragtime genre. It sold 100,000 copies in its first year and eventually became Nonesuch's first million-selling record. The Billboard "Best-Selling Classical LPs" chart for September 28, 1974 has the record at No. 5, with the follow-up "Volume 2" at No. 4, and a combined set of both volumes at No. 3. Separately both volumes had been on the chart for 64 weeks. The album was nominated in 1971 for two Grammy Award categories: Best Album Notes and Best Instrumental Soloist Performance (without orchestra), but at the ceremony on March 14, 1972, Rifkin did not win in any category.
Rifkin's work as a revivalist of Joplin's work immediately preceded the adaptation of Joplin's music by Marvin Hamlisch for the film The Sting (1973). In 1979, Alan Rich in the New York Magazine wrote that by giving artists like Rifkin the opportunity to put Joplin's music on record, Nonesuch Records "created, almost alone, the Scott Joplin revival."

In August 1990, Rifkin recorded a CD for the Decca label (catalog number 425 225) featuring rags by two of the other major composers of ragtime, Joseph Lamb and James Scott, and also tango compositions by the Brazilian composer Ernesto Nazareth.

Bach

Bach's vocal scoring 
Rifkin is best known to classical musicians for his thesis that much of Johann Sebastian Bach's vocal music, including the St Matthew Passion, was performed with only one singer per voice part, an idea generally rejected by his peers when he first proposed it in 1981. In the twenty-first century the idea has become influential, despite still not achieving consensus in the field. The conductor Andrew Parrott wrote a book arguing for the position (The Essential Bach Choir; Boydell Press, 2000; as an appendix the book includes the original paper that Rifkin began to present to the American Musicological Society in 1981, a presentation he was unable to complete because of a strong audience reaction). Bach scholars as Daniel Melamed, David Schulenberg and John Butt have argued in its favor.

Furthermore, Rifkin and Parrott are no longer the only notable conductors to adopt the approach in performance. Among the conductors and ensembles to record and perform music of Bach using some form of the vocal scoring argued for by Rifkin are John Butt with the Dunedin Consort (Magnificat, Cantata no. 63, Mass in B minor in Rifkin's critical edition of the work, discussed below, the St. John Passion, and St Matthew Passion), Konrad Junghänel (Mass in B minor, several cantatas, St. John Passion, and the motets), Sigiswald Kuijken (Mass in B minor, St. John Passion, St Matthew Passion, Christmas Oratorio, and the beginning of a cycle of the complete Bach cantatas), Paul McCreesh (St Matthew Passion, Magnificat, Easter Oratorio, and several cantatas), Monica Huggett (St. John Passion), Eric Milnes, who has begun recording the complete cantatas cycle with one singer per part, Marc Minkowski (Mass in B minor), Lars Ulrik Mortensen (Mass in B minor), Philippe Pierlot with the Ricercar Consort (Magnificat, masses and cantatas), Jeffrey Thomas (who has also often used multi-voice choirs), Jos van Veldhoven (Mass in B minor, St Matthew Passion), Matteo Messori (Christmas Oratorio, cantatas, motets), and Peter Kooy in the motets.

Rifkin himself has recorded Bach's Mass in B minor—his 1981 Nonesuch recording won the 1982–83 Gramophone Award in the Choral category—Magnificat, and cantatas nos. 8, 12, 51, 56, 78, 80, 82, 99, 106, 131, 140, 147, 158, 172, 182, 202, 209, 216, and others, for the Nonesuch, Mainach, L'Oiseau-lyre, and Dorian labels, all with his Bach Ensemble and various singers.

Other Bach scholarship 
One of Rikfin's widely accepted findings, which he published in 1975, is that Bach's St Matthew Passion was first performed on Good Friday, 1727, not 1729 as was previously believed. Rifkin's scholarly critical edition of Bach's Mass in B minor was published by Breitkopf & Härtel in November 2006. It is the first edition to follow strictly Bach's final version from 1748 to 1750, not intermixing readings from the 1733 Missa (the first version of the Kyrie and Gloria), and posits novel solutions to removing edits made posthumously by Bach's son C.P.E. Bach.

Rifkin has done extensive research on the orchestral suites of Bach, in particular arguing in detail that No. 2 in B minor, BWV 1067, is based on an earlier version in A minor in which the solo instrument was not the flute. Rifkin has, further, created reconstructions of J.S. Bach's posited Oboe Concerti: for oboe, strings and continuo in D minor, from BWV 35, 156, 1056 and 1059; in A major for oboe d'amore, strings and continuo from BWV 1055; in E-flat major for oboe, strings and continuo from BWV 49, 169 and 1053. All the original movements are keyboard settings. They reflect the Baroque oboe idiom convincingly. In this form, they evince the influence of the Venetian school, notably Marcello, Corelli and Vivaldi.

In a paper published in the Bach-Jahrbuch in 2000, Rifkin argued that the cantata Nun ist das Heil und die Kraft, BWV 50 was not written by Bach, but by an as-yet unidentified composer.

Studies and career
Rifkin studied with Vincent Persichetti in the Music Division at the Juilliard School and received his Bachelor of Science degree in 1964. He also studied with Gustave Reese at New York University (1964–1966), at the University of Göttingen (1966–1967), and later with Arthur Mendel, Lewis Lockwood, Milton Babbitt, and Ernst Oster at Princeton University, where he received his M.F.A. in 1969. He also worked with Karlheinz Stockhausen at Darmstadt in 1961 and 1965.

Rifkin has taught at several universities, including Brandeis University (1970–1982), Harvard, and Yale, and is currently Professor of Music and Fellow of the University Professors at Boston University. He is noted for his research in the field of Renaissance and Baroque music: scholarship by Rifkin has examined the authorship and chronology of music attributed to Josquin des Prez; Renaissance music manuscripts; the motet around 1500; and music of Heinrich Schütz. He has also published research about Anton Webern.

As a conductor and keyboard soloist, he has appeared with the English Chamber Orchestra, San Francisco Symphony, St. Louis Symphony, Scottish Chamber Orchestra, Victorian State Symphony, and Israel Camerata Jerusalem. He has led operatic productions at Theater Basel in Switzerland and the Bayerische Staatsoper, Munich. He has recorded music of Handel, Mozart, and Haydn with the Concertgebouw Chamber Orchestra and Capella Coloniensis. As a choral conductor he has recorded motets of Adrian Willaert with the Boston Camerata Chamber Singers, and music of the Medici Codex with the Dutch ensemble Capella Pratensis; that 2011 CD, titled Vivat Leo! Music for a Medici Pope, won a Diapason d'Or. Among his works as a composer are the two Winter pieces for violin resp. piano both written in 1961. The Winter piece for violin was premiered by Paul Zukofsky in 1962.

Work in non-classical music
In the 1960s, Rifkin created arrangements for Judy Collins on her albums In My Life and Wildflowers. He performed with the Even Dozen Jug Band (along with David Grisman, Maria Muldaur, Stefan Grossman, and John Sebastian, among others) and made a recording of his humorous re-imaginings of music by Lennon and McCartney in the style of the 18th century, notably Bach, known as The Baroque Beatles Book and recently reissued on CD. In a related vein, Rifkin sang the countertenor solo in the premiere performance of the spoof cantata Iphigenia in Brooklyn by P. D. Q. Bach (Peter Schickele).

Bibliography

References

Sources

Further reading

External links
 Joshua Rifkin biography
 "Joshua Rifkin: Authentic at Heart" (interview from Ha'aretz)
 "Re-inventing Wheels: Joshua Rifkin on Interpretation and Rhetoric" (interview with Rifkin from Bernard Sherman's Inside Early Music)
 "Rifkin's Pesky Idea" (article by Bernard Sherman on the one-per-part controversy, originally published in Early Music America, Summer 1999, p. 48)
 "Schering's Wacky Theory" (Joshua Rifkin's response to Sherman's article, originally published in Early Music America, Fall 1999, p. 48)
 "Interview with Joshua Rifkin" by Uri Golomb, first published in Goldberg Early Music Magazine 51 (June 2008): 56–67

1944 births
20th-century American conductors (music)
21st-century American conductors (music)
American male conductors (music)
American musicologists
Bach conductors
Bach musicians
Bach scholars
Boston University faculty
Brandeis University faculty
Elektra Records artists
Even Dozen Jug Band members
Fiorello H. LaGuardia High School alumni
Harvard University faculty
Juilliard School alumni
Living people
New York University alumni
Princeton University alumni
Ragtime pianists